Days of Speed is Paul Weller's second live album, released on 8 October 2001 in the UK and 2 July 2002 in the US. All songs were performed solo and acoustic from various venues around Europe.

Track listing
All tracks by Paul Weller

"Brand New Start" – 3:46
"The Loved" – 4:23
"Out of the Sinking" – 3:33
"Clues" – 4:40
"English Rose" – 2:44
"Above the Clouds" – 3:45
"You Do Something to Me" – 3:43
"Amongst Butterflies" – 2:57
"Science" – 3:53
"Back in the Fire" – 4:57
"Down in the Seine" – 2:58
"That's Entertainment" – 3:29
"Love-Less" – 4:48
"There's No Drinking, After You're Dead" – 4:33
"Everything Has a Price to Pay" – 4:06
"Wild Wood" – 4:08
"Headstart for Happiness" – 2:51
"Town Called Malice" – 3:27
"The Butterfly Collector" (iTunes Bonus Track) – 3:44 
"Carnation" (iTunes Bonus Track) – 3:25

Personnel 

Tony Cousins – Mastering
Seamus Fenton – Engineer
Simon Halfon – Cover Design, Sleeve Art, Sleeve Design
Andrew Jones – Engineer, Mixing
Pete Mason – Executive Producer
Charles Rees – Mixing
Clive Sparkman – Guitar
Lawrence Watson – Photography
Paul Weller – Guitar (Acoustic), Vocals, Cover Design, Sleeve Art, Sleeve Design

Charts

Weekly charts

Year-end charts

References

2001 live albums
Paul Weller live albums
Independiente Records live albums